The 1935 City of London by-election was held on 26 June 1935.  The by-election was held due to the incumbent Conservative MP, Edward Grenfell being raised to the peerage as Baron St Just.  It was won by the Conservative candidate Alan Anderson.

References

City of London by-election
City of London by-election
City of London by-election
Elections in the City of London
City of London,1935
Unopposed by-elections to the Parliament of the United Kingdom (need citation)